Highking Roberts (born May 23, 1994) is a Belizean footballer who currently plays for Wagiya in the Premier League of Belize and the Belize national team.

International career 
Roberts made his national team debut for Belize on 11 September 2014 in a 2–0 defeat against El Salvador.

International goals
Scores and results list Belize's goal tally first.

References 

1994 births
Living people
Belizean footballers
Belize international footballers
Premier League of Belize players
Association football forwards
Belmopan Bandits players
Police United FC (Belize) players
Wagiya FC players